"She's Kinda Hot" is a song by Australian pop rock band 5 Seconds of Summer. The song is the first single from the band's second album Sounds Good Feels Good. The pop punk and pop rock song was co-written by band members Ashton Irwin and Michael Clifford, alongside Benji and Joel Madden of Good Charlotte and produced by John Feldmann. It was released worldwide on 17 July 2015. The music video was released on 5 August 2015 and has more than 50 million views as of 7 August 2018.

The band followed up the single's release with an EP release on 28 August 2015, featuring bonus tracks and physical editions on both CD and vinyl in certain countries.

Background
Bassist Calum Hood stated in an interview with radio host Angus O'Loughiln: "The title is really misleading because the song is about people not caring of what others think, it's a revolution for outcasts. It has a deep meaning." Lead guitarist Michael Clifford stated, "The song is heavy as hell, heavier than our previous songs. We were shocked but happy with the reviews."

Composition
"She's Kinda Hot" is composed in the key of E major with a tempo of 116–120 beats per minute. Both the verses and chorus are based around twelve-bar blues, specifically, the shuffle-blues chord progression (I I I I / IV IV I I / V IV I I).

Music video
The video directed by Isaac Rentz and shot at the Warner Brothers lot in Hollywood has the band heading into a McMansion garage and working on a vehicle and then, for some reason, are now lounging on the porch of a different house that is more modest farmhouse with deciduous trees  and Michael plays an acoustic guitar Deliverance-style. Intercut is scenes of a guy playing a video game in a 70's style basement with '80s touches and sodacans/pizza/takeout, a guy eats a bowl of cereal and a guy attends a psychotherapist session. All guys get in undesirable situations with high functioning society participants, the video gamer gets harangued by a girlfriend and her friends then abandoned, the cereal eater gets milk and cereal poured on his head by his older jock brother and his friend and the psychotherapist completeley drives her client to a rage. The band then drives their band stage float thats in the style of the Japanese-esque dekotora and then puts on a street concert for the neighbourhoods kid. The video ends with the camera panning up into the night sky and the vehicle exhaust fumes dissipating.

Extended play
The extended play was released in 2015 which contains four tracks: "She’s Kinda Hot - Alternative Version", "Broken Pieces", "Over And Out", and "Lost In Reality".

Track listing

Extended play

Single

Charts

Weekly charts

Year-end charts

Certifications

Release history

References

2015 singles
2015 songs
5 Seconds of Summer songs
Capitol Records singles
Song recordings produced by John Feldmann
Songs written by Ashton Irwin
Songs written by Benji Madden
Songs written by Joel Madden
Songs written by John Feldmann
Songs written by Michael Clifford (musician)